National Route 387 is a national highway of Japan connecting Usa, Ōita and Kita-ku, Kumamoto in Japan, with a total length of 132.6 km (82.39 mi).

References

National highways in Japan
Roads in Kumamoto Prefecture
Roads in Ōita Prefecture